The Basketligaen Finals Most Valuable Player is an annual basketball award that is given by the Danish top tier Basketligaen. It is awarded to the player who was considered to be the best in a finals series of a Basketligaen season.

Winners

References

European basketball awards
Basketball most valuable player awards
Basketligaen